The Ishihara test is a color vision test for detection of red-green color deficiencies. It was named after its designer, Shinobu Ishihara, a professor at the University of Tokyo, who first published his tests in 1917.

The test consists of a number of Ishihara plates, which are a type of pseudoisochromatic plate. Each plate depicts a solid circle of colored dots appearing randomized in color and size. Within the pattern are dots which form a number or shape clearly visible to those with normal color vision, and invisible, or difficult to see, to those with a red-green color vision defect.  Other plates are intentionally designed to reveal numbers only to those with a red-green color vision deficiency, and be invisible to those with normal red-green color vision. The full test consists of 38 plates, but the existence of a severe deficiency is usually apparent after only a few plates. There are also Ishihara tests consisting of 10, 14 or 24 test plates, and plates in some versions ask the viewer to trace a line rather than read a number.

Plates

The plates make up several different test designs:
Demonstration plates: (plate number one, typically the numeral "12"); designed to be visible by all persons, whether normal or color vision deficient.  For demonstration purposes only, and usually not considered in making a score for screening purposes.
Transformation plates: individuals with color vision defect should see a different figure from individuals with normal color vision.
Vanishing plates: only individuals with normal color vision could recognize the figure.
Hidden digit plates: only individuals with color vision defect could recognize the figure.
Diagnostic plates: intended to determine the type of color vision defect (protanopia or deuteranopia) and the severity of it.
Tracing plates: instead of reading a number, subjects are asked to trace a visible line across the plate.

The numbering and rotation of plates differs between the shortened diagnostic versions of the test and the full 38-plate test.

History
Born in 1879 to a family in Tokyo, Shinobu Ishihara began his education at the Imperial University where he attended on a military scholarship. Ishihara had just completed his graduate studies in ophthalmology in Germany when war broke out in Europe and World War I had begun. While holding a military position related to his field, he was given the task of creating a color blindness test. Ishihara studied existing tests and combined elements of the Stilling test, named after the German ophthalmologist Jakob Stilling, with the concept of pseudo-isochromaticism to produce an improved, more accurate and easier to use test.

Test procedures
Being a printed plate, the accuracy of the test depends on using the proper lighting to illuminate the page.  A "daylight" bulb illuminator is required to give the most accurate results, of around 6000–7000 K temperature (ideal: 6500 K, Color Rendering Index (CRI) >90), and is required for military color vision screening policy.  Fluorescent bulbs are often used in school testing, but the color of fluorescent bulbs and their CRI can vary widely.   Fluorescent lighting showed better results and faster recognition speed compared to CFL and LED luminance in trichromats. Incandescent bulbs should not be used, as their low temperature (yellow-color) gives highly inaccurate results, allowing some color vision deficient persons to pass.

Proper testing technique is to give only three seconds per plate for an answer, and not allow coaching, touching or tracing of the numbers by the subject.  The test is best given in random sequence, if possible, to reduce the effectiveness of prior memorization of the answers by subjects.  Some pseudo-isochromatic plate books have the pages in binders, so the plates may be rearranged periodically to give a random order to the test.

Since its creation, the Ishihara Color Blindness Test has become commonly used worldwide because of its easy use and high accuracy. In recent years, the Ishihara test has become available online in addition to its original paper version.  Though both media use the same plates, they require different methods for an accurate diagnosis.

Occupational screening
The United States Navy uses the Ishihara plates (and alternatives) for color vision screening.  The current passing score is 12 correct of 14 red/green test plates (not including the demonstration plate).  Research has shown that scores below twelve indicate color vision deficiency, and twelve or more correct indicate normal color vision, with 97% sensitivity and 100% specificity.  The sensitivity of the Ishihara test varies by the number of plates allowed to pass, which can vary by institutional policy.  Sensitivity also may be influenced by test administration (strength of lighting, time allowed to answer) and testing errors (coaching by administrators, smudges or marks made upon the plates).

References

Notes

External links

The College of Optometrist - Ishihara and other colour vision tests

Color vision
Diagnostic ophthalmology
Test items
Japanese inventions